Better Business Bureau (BBB) is a private, 501(c)(6) nonprofit organization founded in 1912. BBB's self-described mission is to focus on advancing marketplace trust, consisting of 97 independently incorporated local BBB organizations in the United States and Canada, coordinated under the International Association of Better Business Bureaus (IABBB) in Arlington, Virginia.

Better Business Bureau is not affiliated with any governmental agency. Businesses that affiliate with BBB and adhere to its standards do so through industry self-regulation. To avoid bias, BBB's policy is to refrain from recommending or endorsing any specific business, product or service.

The BBB rating system uses an A+ through F letter-grade scale. The grades represent BBB's degree of confidence that the business is operating in good faith and will resolve customer concerns filed with the BBB. BBB's ratings are explained on its Ratings Overview page.  BBB employees evaluate a business's behavior when assigning a rating.

According to BBB, nearly 400,000 local businesses in North America were accredited as of July 2022. BBB prospects successfully vetted businesses to become dues-paying 'accredited businesses' that pledge and continue to adhere to the BBB Code of Business Practices. In return, BBB allows accredited businesses in good standing to use its trademarked logo in marketing materials.

History

The concept of the Better Business Bureau has been credited to several court cases, such as United States v. Forty Barrels and Twenty Kegs of Coca-Cola, initiated by the government against a number of organizations, including the Coca-Cola Company in 1906.

In 1909, Samuel Candler Dobbs became president of the Associated Advertising Clubs of America, now the American Advertising Federation (AAF), and began to make speeches on the subject. In 1911, he was involved in the adoption of the "Ten Commandments of Advertising," one of the first codes of advertising developed by groups of advertising firms and individual businesses. Similar organizations in succeeding decades, such as the National Better Business Commission, Inc. of the Associated Advertising Clubs of the World (1921), and the National Association of Better Business Bureaus, Inc. (1933), merged to become the Association of Better Business Bureaus, Inc., in 1946. In 1970, the Council of Better Business Bureaus (CBBB) was established by a merger of the Association of Better Business Bureaus and the National Better Business Bureau. The Council of BBBs included the Philanthropic Advisory Service (PAS), which advised donors about national charities. PAS later merged with the National Charities Information Bureau to form the BBB Wise Giving Alliance.

In 2019 the Council of BBBs split into three entities - the BBB Wise Giving Alliance (advice for donors to charities), BBB National Programs (national industry self-regulatory programs), and the International Association of Better Business Bureaus (BBB's self-governing organization.)

Structure and funding
Each BBB is overseen by its own board of directors and chief executive officer. Each must meet international BBB standards, which are monitored by the IABBB. The IABBB is governed by leaders of local BBBs, as well as several independent subject matter experts such as academics and legal experts. BBBs are chiefly funded by local accredited businesses, which also make up BBB boards of directors. A study by a business school dean at Marquette University found that ninety percent of BBB board members are from business.

Businesses that move from one BBB jurisdiction to another may need to apply for BBB accreditation in the new BBB location unless they have a system-wide accreditation. IABBB is funded primarily by membership dues from BBBs, which vary from year to year.

Dispute resolution procedures
BBB handles complaints from consumers about their marketplace experiences with businesses, and also publishes customer reviews both positive and negative. The organization provides dispute resolution through procedures established by the International Association of Better Business Bureaus, and implemented by local BBBs. Usually, disputes can be resolved through mediation; when appropriate, low- or no‑cost arbitration may also be offered and provided through the BBB.  BBB acts as a neutral party when providing dispute resolution services.

Complaints about the practice of professions like medicine and law are usually not handled by BBB and are referred to associations regulating those professions. BBB does not handle complaints that have gone to court or are in the process of going to court as the complaint is already being handled by an alternate entity.

If BBB receives a consumer dispute, BBB contacts the business in question and offers to mediate the dispute. A business does not need to be a member of BBB to use its mediation services. BBB accreditation, or membership, is completely optional for a business to accept and participate in through the payment of dues. Past complaints allege that BBB compiles ratings based upon their ability to collect money from businesses, and not entirely upon business performance.  However, since 2010, no relationship exists between a business's rating and its accreditation status.

Rating system and accreditation
Until 2008, BBB rated companies "satisfactory" or "unsatisfactory." On January 1, 2009, BBB moved to a new system based on a school-style A+ to F rating system. The 16 factors have been posted on each business profile since the program's inception and the details on the points awarded as well. Initially there was a 17th factor worth 4 points for businesses that were Accredited.  That process was changed in November 2010 in response to criticism in the media and from the Connecticut attorney general who accused BBB of using "pay to play" tactics. The Attorney General of Connecticut demanded that BBB stop using its weighted letter grade system, calling it "potentially harmful and misleading" to consumers.  In response, the Council of Better Business Bureaus changed the BBB ratings system to cease awarding points to businesses for being BBB members, and to institute closer monitoring of BBB sales practices.

If a business chooses not to provide basic information, such as size and start date, BBB may assign a not-rated (NR) rating. An "NR" rating due solely to a company not providing information would state: "BBB does not have sufficient background information on this business."

A business is eligible for BBB accreditation if it meets, in the opinion of BBB, "BBB Standards for Trust". There are eight BBB Standards for Trust that BBB expects its accredited businesses to adhere to: build trust ("maintain a positive track record in the marketplace"), advertise honestly, tell the truth, be transparent, honor promises, be responsive (address marketplace disputes), safeguard privacy (protect consumer data) and embody integrity.

Criticism
In 2010 ABC's 20/20 reported in a segment titled "The Best Ratings Money Can Buy" about the irregularities in BBB ratings.  They reported that a man created two dummy companies which received A+ ratings as soon as he had paid the membership fee to the BBB of the Southland, serving the Los Angeles area. They also reported that business owners in Los Angeles were told that the only way to improve their rating was by paying the fee. In one case a C was turned to an A immediately after a payment and in another case a C‑minus became an A+. The chef Wolfgang Puck said that some of his L.A.-based businesses received F ratings because he refused to pay a fee. These allegations led to procedures against the BBB of the Southland from the BBB system. On March 12, 2013, the Council of Better Business Bureaus expelled the Los Angeles-based Better Business Bureau of the Southland, the largest local BBB, claiming that the group had not met the Council's "standards relating to accreditation, reporting on businesses, and handling complaints." The Los Angeles chapter disputed the charges and continued to operate under the new name of Business Consumer Alliance.  From March to November 2013, BBB served the four-county Los Angeles area via a "Virtual BBB" staffed by volunteers from other BBBs. The effort won the American Society of Association Executives "Power of Association" award. In November 2013 the Council of Better Business Bureaus reassigned the Los Angeles area to three established California BBBs.

In 2011, a New York Times columnist described a complaint from a consumer that the Austin chapter of the Better Business Bureau refused to resolve complaints against companies if customers do not pay a $70 mediation fee.

Canada

Integration of US and Canadian operations
On August 16, 2011, the then-named Council of Better Business Bureaus (CBBB) announced the formal integration of operations in the United States & Canada, effective immediately.

According to the statement, integration marks the way "for an improved customer experience for those who purchase goods and services across the border". Stephen A. Cox, President and CEO of CBBB, said: "The U.S. and Canada remain each other's largest trading partners. We are really one North American marketplace, and the BBB system now reflects that. Not only will it be easier for consumers to check out businesses in either country, it will be simpler for them to file a complaint or resolve a dispute." The move was supported by the Canadian Council of Better Business Bureaus (CCBBB). "Given the advances in technology and the globalization of services, it no longer makes sense to maintain two separate systems," said M. Jean Lemyre, chair of the CCBBB. "The vast majority of consumers initially contact BBB through the Internet. Aligning BBB services into one integrated system will be more efficient for businesses in Canada, and will ensure that consumers continue to receive the high quality of services they've come to expect from BBB."

BBB trademark authorization revoked from four Canadian offices
The then-named Council of Better Business Bureaus (CBBB) revoked the BBB name & trademark from four Canadian Better Business Bureaus. The CBBB said it made the move to withdraw trademark authorization from the offices in Hamilton, Windsor, Montreal and St. John's after determining these four Canadian offices did not meet the defined standards of operation.

CBBB realigned the boundaries of its affected Canadian offices and folded them into larger offices. Hamilton has been gathered under the banner of the BBB's Kitchener office, while the territories in SW Ontario (including Windsor) are now part of the Western Ontario region based in London, ON.

The Hamilton, Montreal & St. John's offices have also changed their names or closed following what they termed a takeover by the U.S.-based Council of Better Business Bureaus. The Hamilton, Ontario BBB adopted the name Canadian Businesses and Charity Bureau. In May 2012, the Hamilton organization was locked out of its office by its landlord in a rent dispute and ceased to operate.  The Montreal BBB changed its name to L'Office de Certification Commerciale du Québec or Québec Commercial Certification Office, while the BBB in St. John's, Newfoundland closed.  These areas have since been picked up by others, and as of August 2022, all of Canada is served by 10 BBBs.

See also

 Angie's List
 ConsumerAffairs
 ResellerRatings
 Sitejabber
 Trustpilot

References

External links
 
 Give.org – BBB Wise Giving Alliance

Business organizations based in the United States
Business ethics organizations
Corporate governance
Organizations established in 1912
American review websites
Auditors
Self-regulatory organizations
1912 establishments in the United States
501(c)(6) nonprofit organizations
Organizations based in Arlington County, Virginia